Arts District is a district in Downtown Bakersfield, California, USA. It is a major center for visual and performing arts. Several art galleries are located in the district, with most of them centered on the intersection of 19th Street and Eye Street. Several theater groups are also located in the district. Its boundaries are marked with banners, which were erected by the Arts Council of Kern.

Theaters
The following theaters are located in the district:
The Empty Space
Fox Theater
Ovation Theater
Stars Theater

Transportation
The Downtown Transit Center is located in the district. It is one of several transit centers owned and operated by Golden Empire Transit. Several of its routes use the stop, which serves urban Bakersfield. It is also used by Kern Regional Transit as one of its Bakersfield hubs for its inter-regional service.

References

Neighborhoods in Bakersfield, California
Tourist attractions in Bakersfield, California
Arts districts